Martin Michael Sellner (born 8 January 1989) is an Austrian far-right political activist, and leader of the Identitarian Movement of Austria. He is also involved an important role within the Neue Rechte in Germany.

In March 2018, he was denied entry to, and deported from, the United Kingdom. A year later, he was denied entry to the United States.

Early life
Sellner was raised outside of Vienna. He became involved in nationalist politics as a teenager, being part of Austria's neo-Nazi scene.

Neo-Nazi activity 
In 2006, at the age of 17, Sellner admitted to placing stickers with another person on a synagogue in Baden bei Wien, Lower Austria. Stickers with a swastika and the inscription "Legalise it" as well as stickers with a coat of arms and the letters AJ (for "Aryan Youth") were used. The accomplice later stated in an interrogation that they had "wanted to do something" when they heard about the conviction of the British Holocaust denier David Irving. Sellner did 100 hours of community service in a diversion at the Jewish cemetery in Baden, leading to the public prosecutor's office renouncing a criminal trial.

In 2008, he helped a leading Austrian neo-Nazi group hinder liberal demonstrations and made pilgrimages to memorial services for Wehrmacht soldiers. In 2016, he said that he had broken with neo-Nazism, and that the rising popularity of Nazism is a failure of society.

In April 2016, he disrupted a theatre performance of Elfriede Jelinek's piece, Die Schutzbefohlenen (theatre performance with migrants seeking asylum), along with around 30 members of his organisation, spilling fake blood. The blood was intended to symbolize the "blood of Bataclan and Brussels".

Legal and visa problems 
In February 2017, Sellner was involved in a fight in a Vienna U-Bahn station where he used pepper spray on people he described as far-left activists. Since this incident, he has been banned from carrying weapons.

In March 2018, Sellner and his girlfriend Brittany Pettibone were denied entry to the United Kingdom at Luton Airport on the grounds that their presence in the United Kingdom was not conducive to the public good. Sellner intended to deliver an address at Speakers' Corner in Hyde Park, London. They were denied entry, detained for two days and deported.

On 25 March 2019, Sellner's apartment was searched by the Austrian police. His computer, mobile phone, all data storage devices and cash cards were confiscated on suspicion that he was a member of a terrorist organization; early in 2018 he had received a donation of $1,500 from the Australian-born suspect in the Christchurch mosque shootings in Christchurch, New Zealand. Sellner denied any involvement in the attacks.

According to Sellner, U.S. authorities canceled his permit to travel without a visa to the United States thus preventing him from visiting Pettibone, who was now his fiancée. In 2019, the Republican Committee of Pettibone's home county of Kootenai County, Idaho, called on the American federal government to allow Sellner to travel to the United States. The move caused considerable controversy within the Republican Party and the State of Idaho. Sellner has said he wants to be allowed into the country so he can marry his fiancée and so they can live together in Post Falls, Idaho, rather than his native Austria.

Austrian police expanded their searches of Sellner's property during June 2019 in connection with the Christchurch shootings.  This search was later ruled illegal by a judge.

In June 2019, Sellner was permanently excluded from entering the UK on security grounds.

Views
Wolfgang Ullrich has suggested that there are connections between the worldview of Sellner and the theories of the philosopher Martin Heidegger and the political theorist Carl Schmitt.

ITV's documentary film investigation Undercover – The New British Far-Right claimed the existence of undercover footage of Sellner discussing contacts between Generation Identity and white supremacist groups in the United States, but stated that these contacts must be hidden due to public relations. The documentary claimed that Sellner stated that Jews were a problem in the 1920s and made references to the "Jewish question". Sellner also said that the domination of the American alt-right by the "Jewish question" is a "complete strategical and theoretical failure". It claimed he said he was an antisemite in his youth, and that his friends made offensive comments about the Holocaust. He supports The Great Replacement conspiracy theory. Sellner responded by calling the documentary a "hit piece", and that the statements were taken out of context. In a statement released by Generation Identity and Sellner, they stated that the group wants to preserve European "ethno-cultural identity" and stated that the group has no hidden agendas.

Sellner is regarded as a member of the alt-right movement.

Personal life 
In 2016, Sellner was studying philosophy in Vienna. He dropped out of law school.

Sellner married Brittany Pettibone, an American alt-right activist, in 2019.

References

University of Vienna alumni
Politicians from Vienna
Identitarian movement
1989 births
Austrian activists
Antisemitism in Austria
Alt-right activists
Far-right politics in Austria
Living people
People deported from the United Kingdom
Austrian anti-communists
Austrian fascists
Pan-European nationalism
Austrian conspiracy theorists
Anti-Masonry